Chlorogenia cholerota is a moth of the subfamily Arctiinae first described by Edward Meyrick in 1889. It is found in New Guinea.

References

External links
Original description: Meyrick, Edward (1889). "On some Lepidoptera from New Guinea". Transactions of the Entomological Society of London. 1889: 461-462.

Lithosiini